Jussy-Champagne is a commune in the Cher department in the Centre-Val de Loire region of France.

Geography

Population

Sights
 The church of St. André, dating from the twelfth century.
 A sixteenth-century chateau.
 A watermill.

See also
Communes of the Cher department

References

Communes of Cher (department)